Apache VXQuery (or Versatile XQuery) is a standards-compliant XML Query processor that is implemented in Java. It is still in the Apache Incubator and may be added to the projects in the near future. Apache VXQuery is developed to meet demands to process semi-structured data in applications. Apache VXQuery complies to the W3C-standardized XML Query Language v1.0.

Features
Apache VXQuery unites the imperative component of Java and the XQuery declarative programming. The project will enable developers to use XQuery to navigate and transform application objects declaratively in Java applications with minimal overhead.

See also

 Apache HTTP Server
 Apache Software Foundation

References

VXQuery
XQuery processors